The 2006–07 Swiss Super League was the 110th season of top-tier football in Switzerland. The competition is officially named AXPO Super League due to sponsoring purposes. It began on 19 July 2006 and has ended on 24 May 2007.

Teams

League table

Results 
Teams play each other four times in this league. In the first half of the season each team played every other team twice (home and away) and then do the same in the second half of the season.

First half of season

Second half of season

Relegation play-offs
FC Aarau as 9th-placed team of the Super League were played a two-legged play-off against Challenge League runners-up AC Bellinzona.

Aarau won 5–2 on aggregate and retain their place in the Swiss Super League.

Top goal scorers
Last updated on May 20, 2007

External links
 Super league website 

Swiss Super League seasons
Swiss
1